Alexander Gavrylyuk (born 19 August 1984) is a Ukrainian-born Australian pianist.

Career 
Gavrylyuk's first concert performance was at the age of nine. He moved to Australia at the age of 13.

In 1999 he won the Vladimir Horowitz Competition, in 2000 the Hamamatsu Competition and in 2005 the Arthur Rubinstein International Piano Master Competition.

Gavrylyuk has held solo recitals at, among others, Wigmore Hall in London, Musikverein in Vienna, Tonhalle, Zürich and Konzerthaus Berlin. The major orchestras he has performed with include: the Sydney Symphony Orchestra, the Royal Concertgebouw Orchestra, New York Philharmonic, Israel Philharmonic Orchestra, Moscow Philharmonic Orchestra, Bournemouth Symphony Orchestra, Warsaw National Philharmonic Orchestra and the Royal Scottish National Orchestra.

He has recorded Sergei Prokofiev's five concertos with the Sydney Symphony Orchestra under Vladimir Ashkenazy. In 2013 and 2014, he gave cycle performances of all four Rachmaninov concertos as well as the Rhapsody on a Theme of Paganini, with Neeme Järvi (Orchestre de la Suisse Romande) and Bramwell Tovey (Vancouver Symphony Orchestra), respectively.

Other conductors with whom Gavrylyuk has collaborated include: Herbert Blomstedt, Vladimir Jurowski, Vasily Petrenko, Osmo Vänskä, Louis Langrée, Andrey Boreyko, Vladimir Spivakov, Oleg Caetani and Yuri Simonov.

As part of the 2017 London Prom season at the Royal Albert Hall he performed Rachmaninov's Third Concerto with the BBC Scottish Symphony Orchestra under Thomas Dausgaard to great acclaim.

Awards 
 1999 - First prize and Gold Medal at the 1999 Horowitz International Piano Competition
 2000 - First Prize at the Hamamatsu International Piano Competition in Japan
 2003 - Named Steinway Artist
 2005 - Gold Medal at the Arthur Rubinstein International Piano Masters Competition in Tel Aviv.

Recordings 
 Brahms: Paganini Variations; Liszt: Mephisto Waltz; Tarantella; Danse Macabre; Isolde's Liebestod / Alexander Gavrylyuk. Label: Piano Classics, 2015. 
 Mussorgsky: Pictures At An Exhibition; Schumann: Kinderszenen / Alexander Gavrylyuk. Label: Piano Classics, 2014.
 Rachmaninov: Moments Musicaux; Scriabin: Sonata No 5; Prokofiev: Sonata No 7 / Alexander Gavrylyuk. Label: Piano Classics, 2011.
 Prokofiev: Piano Concertos Nos. 3 & 5 / Alexander Gavrylyuk, Vladimir Ashkenazy. Label: Triton (Octavia), 2011.
 Sergei Prokofiev: Piano Concertos Nos. 1, 2 & 4 "left Hand" / Alexander Gavrylyuk, Vladimir Ashkenazy.  Label: Triton (Octavia), 2011.
 Alexander Gavrylyuk In Recital -  Arcadi Volodos,  Sergei Rachmaninov,  Mily Balakirev,  Moritz Moszkowski. Label: Video Artists International, 2010. (2 disks)
 Miami International Piano Festival / Alexander Gavrylyuk - Franz Joseph Haydn,  Johannes Brahms,  Alexander Scriabin,  Sergei Prokofiev. Label: Vai Audio, 2006. (2 disks).

External links 
 Agency Biography
 Alexander Gavrylyuk Website

References

Ukrainian classical pianists
Australian classical pianists
Male classical pianists
Australian people of Ukrainian descent
Living people
1984 births
21st-century classical pianists
21st-century Australian male musicians
21st-century Australian musicians
Musicians from Kharkiv